Melbourne Grand Prix may refer to:

Australian Grand Prix, a Formula One auto race
Melbourne Grand Prix Circuit, a motor racing track
Melbourne Grand Prix (tennis), a Grand Prix tennis tournament played from 1982 through 1985